The Kalombo suckermouth (Chiloglanis kalambo) is a species of upside-down catfish endemic to Tanzania where it occurs in the Kalambo River.  This species grows to a length of  TL.

References

External links 

Chiloglanis
Freshwater fish of Africa
Fish of Tanzania
Endemic fauna of Tanzania
Taxonomy articles created by Polbot
Fish described in 1996
Taxa named by Lothar Seegers